Sno*Drift 2005 was a car rally held on January 28–29, 2005 as part of the Rally America ProRally and ClubRally series around Atlanta, Michigan.  It was the 19th Sno*Drift event held, and the 16th to be held as part of a national series.

Summary
Like other recent Sno*Drift events, Sno*Drift 2005 was a part of the national ProRally program, with 2005 marking the first year under Rally America sanctioning.  Previously, the SCCA had sanctioned the event.  The event covered two days and featured special stages of primarily snow-covered gravel roads around the Atlanta area.  In addition to the two-day event, two ClubRally events were also held synchronized with the ProRally event.  These events were Sno 2005, covering the stages of the first day, and sanctioned as a coefficient 2 Central Regional Rally, and Drift 2005, covering the second day's stages and sanctioned as a coefficient 3 rally.  Since these events were simultaneous with the national event, a competitor could participate in both national and regional rallies, with their stage times applied to both events.  47 crews entered the competition.  The course included 17 special stages, of which one (SS9) was cancelled.

National entries
Crew entries totalled 47, of which 25 were entered in the national event and 32 were entered in the regional events.  Ten crews were entered in all three events, and three crews were only entered in the Drift 2005 regional rally.  Each entrant was given a seed number to assist in determining the start order.  Lowest seeds would start first on stages, as they were ideally quicker drivers.  Entries are listed as car no. / driver / co-driver / vehicle / class.

Seed 0 entries
 # 1 / Patrick Richard / Nathalie Richard ( / 2002 Subaru WRX STi / Group N
 Completed event in overall 1st Place (Time 1:57:44.8)
 Stage wins in SS1 through SS5, SS8, and SS10 through SS-17.
 # 25 / Seamus Burke / Jason Gillespie / 2003 Mitsubishi Lancer Evo VIII / Open
 Did not finish, retiring after SS7.
 Stage wins in SS6 & SS7

Seed 1 entries
 # 52 / Doug Shepherd / Bob Martin / 2005 Dodge SRT4 / Group 5
 # 83 / Mark Utecht / Rob Bohn / 2002 Subaru WRX / Group N
 # 91 / Jonathan Bottoms / Carolyn Bosley / 2002 Subaru WRX / Group N

Seed 2 entries
 # 44 / Henry Krolikowski / Cindy Krolikowski / 2000 Subaru WRX STi / Group N
 # 99 / Matthew Iorio / Ole Holter / 2001 Subaru Impreza / Open
 # 947 / William Bacon / Peter Watt / 2004 Subaru WRX STi / Group N

Seed 3 entries
 # 27 / Chris Gilligan / Joe Petersen / 1997 Mitsubishi Lancer Evo IV / Open
 # 42 / Eric Burmeister / Dave Shindle / 2003 Mazda Protege / Group 5
 # 53 / Don Jankowski / Ken Nowak / 2001 Dodge Neon ACR / Production
 # 93 / Bob Olson / Conrad Ketelsen / 1999 Subaru Impreza 2.5 RS / Production GT
 # 143 / Chris Whiteman / Mike Rossey / 2004 Dodge SRT4 / Group 5
 # 429 / Tanner Foust / Scott Crouch / 2002 Subaru WRX / Production GT
 # 508 / Tom Ottey / Pam McGarvey / 1989 Mazda 323 GTX / Open
 # 774 / Otis Dimiters / Peter Monin / 2002 Subaru WRX STi / Group N

Seed 4 entries
 # 59 / Patrick Moro / Ryan Johnson / 2002 Subaru WRX / Production GT
 # 82 / Joan Hoskinson / Jeff Secor / 2000 Subaru Impreza RS / Production GT

Seed 5 entries
 # 60 / Bruce Davis / Jimmy Brandt / 2000 Dodge Neon / Group 5
 # 543 / Mike Merbach / Jeff Feldt / 1990 Volkswagen Jetta / Production
 # 558 / Jim Cox / Mark Larson / 2004 Chevrolet S-10 / Open

Seed 7 entries
 # 153 / Eric Langbein / Jeremy Wimpey / 1988 Toyota All-Trac / Production GT
 # 587 / Matt Johnston / Alex Kihurani / 1992 Honda Civic / Group 2

Seed 8 entries
 # 43 / Ken Block/ Christian Edstrom / 2004 Subaru WRX STi / Group N
 # 78 / Mark Podoluch / Kazimierz Pudelek / 1993 Subaru Impreza / Open

Regional entries

Seed 1 entries 

 # 83 / Mark Utecht / Rob Bohn / 2002 Subaru WRX / Group N

Seed 2 entries
 # 99 / Matthew Iorio / Ole Holter / 2001 Subaru Impreza / Open

Seed 3 entries
 # 86 / Mike Halley / Kala Rounds / 1999 Volkswagen Beetle / Group 5
 # 93 / Bob Olson / Conrad Ketelsen / 1999 Subaru Impreza 2.5 RS / Production GT
 # 429 / Tanner Foust / Scott Crouch / 2002 Subaru WRX / Production GT
 # 508 / Tom Ottey / Pam McGarvey / 1989 Mazda 323 GTX / Open
 # 774 / Otis Dimiters / Peter Monin / 2002 Subaru WRX STi / Group N

Seed 4 entries
 # 26 / Cary Kendall / Scott Friberg / 1990 Eagle Talon / Open
 # 535 / Jake Himes / Matt Himes / 1992 Nissan Sentra / Group 2

Seed 5 entries
 # 515 / Adam Boullion / Phillip Boullion / 1995 Dodge Neon / Production
 # 524 / Art Burmeister / Kent Gardam / 1988 Volkswagen Golf / Group 2
 # 543 / Mike Merbach / Jeff Feldt / 1990 Volkswagen Jetta / Production
 # 558 / Jim Cox / Mark Larson / 2004 Chevrolet S-10 / Open
 # 562 / Brian Dondlinger / Dave Parps / 1994 Nissan Sentra SE-R / Group 2
 # 592 / Justin Pritchard / Kim DeMotte / 1990 Volkswagen Golf / Group 2
 # 595 / John Cirisan / Josh Hamacher / 2004 Subaru WRX / Production GT
 # 811 / Wojtek Okula / Adam Pelc / 2002 Subaru Impreza / Production GT

Seed 6 entries
 # 590 / Joel Sanford / Jeff Hribar / 1989 Chevrolet Cavalier / Group 2
 # 622 / Larry Parker / Ray Summers / 1992 Eagle Talon / Open

Seed 7 entries
 # 548 / Matt Bushore / Andy Bushore / 1985 Volkswagen Jetta / Group 2
 # 598 / Pete Hascher / Scott Rhoades / 1993 Honda Prelude / Group 5
 # 617 / Eric Mozer / Jay Efting / 1987 Alfa Romeo Milano / Group 2
 # 624 / Karen Pruzycki / Bob Pierce / 1979 Ford Fiesta / Group 2
 # 684 / Adam Markut / John Nordlie / 1992 Eagle Talon TSI / Production GT
 # 690 / Carl Seidel / Eric Iverson / 1988 Volkswagen Golf / Production
 # 976 / Russell Rosendale / Pete Oppelt / 1987 Volkswagen Golf / Group 2

Seed 8 entries
 # 43 / Ken Block / Christian Edstrom / 2004 Subaru WRX STi / Group N
 # 78 / Mark Podoluch / Kazimierz Pudelek / 1993 Subaru Impreza / Open
 # 200 / Brett Fairbanks / Christopher Greenhouse / 1981 Volkswagen Rabbit / Group 2
 # 627 / Marcin Kowalski / Marek Cichocki / 1990 Mitsubishi Eclipse / Group 5
 # 628 / Daniel Adamson / Jason Takkunen / 1998 Saturn SL2 / Group 2
 # 680 / Greg Woodside / Tom Woodside / 1987 Dodge Shadow / Group 5

Results
For class winners, the place number in parenthesis is their overall ranking.

National overall podium winners
 P. Richard & N. Richard (#2; WRX STi)
 M. Iorio & O. Holter (#99; Impreza)
 C. Gilligan & J. Peterson (#27; Evo IV)

National Open
 (2nd) M. Iorio & O. Holter (#99; Impreza)
 (3rd) C. Gilligan & J. Peterson (#27; Evo IV)
 (10th) T. Ottey & P. McGarvey (#508; 323 GTX)
 (14th) J. Cox & M. Larson (#558; S-10)
 (DNF) S. Burke & J. Gillespie (#25; Evo VIII)
 (DNF) M. Podoluch & K. Pudelek (#78; Impreza)

National Group N
 (1st) P. Richard & N. Richard (#1; WRX STi)
 (4th) J. Bottoms & C. Bosley (#91; WRX)
 (5th) H. Krolikowski & C. Krolikowski (#44; WRX STi)
 (6th) M. Utecht & R. Bohn (#83; WRX)
 (7th) K. Block & C. Edstrom (#43; WRX STi)
 (17th) W. Bacon & P. Watt (#947; WRX STi)
 (18th) O. Dimiters & P. Monin (#774; WRX STi)

National Group 5
 (9th) D. Shephard & B. Martin (#52; SRT4)
 (11th) C. Whiteman & M. Rossey (#143; SRT4)
 (13th) E. Burmeister & D. Shindle (#42; Protege)
 (16th) B. Davis & J. Brandt (#60; Neon)

National Group 2
 (21st) M. Johnston & A. Kihurani (#587; Civic)

National Production GT Class
 (8th) T. Foust & S. Crouch (#429; WRX)
 (12th) E. Langbein & J. Wimpey (#153; All-Trac)
 (19th) J. Hoskinson & J. Secor (#82; Impreza RS)
 (DNF) B. Olson & C. Ketelsen (#93; Impreza RS)
 (DNF) P. Moro & R. Johnson (#59; WRX)

National Production Class
 (15th) D. Jankowski & K. Nowak (#53; Neon ACR)
 (20th) M. Merbach & J. Feldt (#543; Jetta)

Sno Regional overall podium winners
 M. Iorio & O. Holter (#99; Impreza)
 T. Foust & S. Crouch (#429; WRX)
 T. Ottey & P. McGarvey (#508; 323 GTX)

Sno Regional Open Class
 (1st) M. Iorio & O. Holter (#99; Impreza)
 (3rd) T. Ottey & P. McGarvey (#508; 323 GTX)
 (7th) C. Kendall & S. Friberg (#26; Talon)
 (10th) J. Cox & M. Larson (#558; S-10)
 (24th) L. Parker & R. Summers (#622; Impreza)
 (DNF) M. Podoluch & K. Pudelek (#78; Impreza)

Sno Regional Group N
 (5th) K. Block & C. Edstrom (#43; WRX STi)
 (6th) M. Utecht & R. Bohn (#83; WRX)
 (22nd) O. Dimiters & P. Monin (#774; WRX STi)

Sno Regional Group 5
 (12th) G. Woodside & T. Woodside (#680; Shadow)
 (13th) M. Halley & K. Rounds (#86; Beetle)
 (15th) P. Hascher & S. Rhoades (#598; Prelude)
 (20th) M. Kowalski & M. Cichocki (#627; Eclipse)

Sno Regional Group 2
 (8th) J. Pritchard & K. DeMotte (#592; Golf)
 (11th) J. Sanford & J. Hribar (#590; Cavalier)
 (18th) R. Rosendale & P. Oppelt (#976; Golf)
 (21st) B. Fairbanks & C. Greenhouse (#200; Rabbit)
 (23rd) D. Adamson & J. Takkunen (#628; Saturn)
 (DNF) M. Bushore & A. Bushore (#548; Jetta)
 (DNF) J. Himes & M. Himes (#535; Sentra)
 (DNF) B. Dondlinger & D. Parps (#562; Sentra SE-R)

Sno Regional Production GT Class
 (2nd) T. Foust & S. Crouch (#429; WRX)
 (4th) J. Cirisan & J. Hamacher (#43; WRX STi)
 (16th) W. Okula & A. Pelc (#811; Impreza)
 (19th) A. Markut & J. Nordlie (#684; Talon TSI)
 (DNF) B. Olson & C. Ketelsen (#93; Impreza RS 2.5)

Sno Regional Production Class
 (9th) A. Boullion & P. Boullion (#515; Neon)
 (14th) C. Seidel & E. Iverson (#690; Golf)
 (17th) M. Merbach & J. Feldt (#543; Jetta)

Drift Regional overall podium winners
 M. Utecht & R. Bohn (#83; WRX)
 O. Dimiters & P. Monin (#774; WRX STi)
 M. Iorio & O. Holter (#99; Impreza)

Drift Regional Open Class
 (3rd) M. Iorio & O. Holter (#99; Impreza)
 (5th) C. Kendall & S. Friberg (#26; Talon)
 (7th) T. Ottey & P. McGarvey (#508; 323 GTX)
 (13th) J. Cox & M. Larson (#558; S-10)
 (22nd) L. Parker & R. Summers (#622; Impreza)
 (DNF) M. Podoluch & K. Pudelek (#78; Impreza)

Drift Regional Group N
 (1st) M. Utecht & R. Bohn (#83; WRX)
 (2nd) O. Dimiters & P. Monin (#774; WRX STi)
 (4th) K. Block & C. Edstrom (#43; WRX STi)

Drift Regional Group 5
 (15th) G. Woodside & T. Woodside (#680; Shadow)
 (19th) M. Halley & K. Rounds (#86; Beetle)
 (26th) M. Kowalski & M. Cichocki (#627; Eclipse)
 (DNF) P. Hascher & S. Rhoades (#598; Prelude)

Drift Regional Group 2
 (8th) J. Pritchard & K. DeMotte (#592; Golf)
 (11th) J. Himes & M. Himes (#535; Sentra)
 (12th) J. Sanford & J. Hribar (#590; Cavalier)
 (14th) B. Dondlinger & D. Parps (#562; Sentra SE-R)
 (20th) A. Burmeister & K. Gardam (#524; Golf)
 (21st) R. Rosendale & P. Oppelt (#976; Golf)
 (23rd) E. Mozer & J. Efting (#617; Milano)
 (24th) K. Pruzycki & B. Pierce (#624; Fiesta)
 (25th) B. Fairbanks & C. Greenhouse (#200; Rabbit)
 (DNF) M. Bushore & A. Bushore (#548; Jetta)
 (DNF) D. Adamson & J. Takkunen (#628; Saturn)

Drift Regional Production GT Class
 (6th) T. Foust & S. Crouch (#429; WRX)
 (9th) B. Olson & C. Ketelsen (#93; Impreza RS 2.5)
 (10th) A. Markut & J. Nordlie (#684; Talon TSI)
 (16th) W. Okula & A. Pelc (#811; Impreza)
 (DNF) J. Cirisan & J. Hamacher (#43; WRX STi)

Drift Regional Production Class
 (17th) C. Seidel & E. Iverson (#690; Golf)
 (18th) M. Merbach & J. Feldt (#543; Jetta)
 (DNF) A. Boullion & P. Boullion (#515; Neon)

See also
 Sno*Drift
 SCCA
 Rally America

Rally America
2005 in rallying
2005 in American motorsport